Leave the Light On is an album by Beth Hart. Several versions of this album exist, ranging from the very original release in New Zealand in the spring of 2003 (on Warner Music NZ), the standard international version released worldwide later in the fall of 2003 (on Koch Records), then several specialized reissues in various European markets over the following few years. The German release (on Universal Music GmbH) contains entirely new recordings of three previously released songs, as well as three newer songs that would later be re-recorded for her next studio album 37 Days.

Track listings

Personnel
Musicians

Beth Hart - vocals, piano
 Richard Baker AKA Richard John Baker - Hammond B3 organ
 Rev. Brady Blade – drums
 Jimmie Bones – organ
 Mike Bradford – bass, keyboards, guitar, bass guitar, electric piano
 Paul Buckmaster – string arrangements, string conductor
 Jorgen Carlsson – bass
 Kevin Cloud – drums
 Chris Frazer Smith – hammond organ
 David Gamson – keyboards
 Sergio González – drums
 Bernie Hershey – conga, drums
 Jerry Hey – horn

 Dan Higgins – horn
 Russ Kunkel – drums
 Oliver Leiber – guitar
 Greg Leisz – pedal steel
 Tom Lilly – bass, bass guitar
 Scott Miracle – drums
 Albert Molinaro – bass, bass guitar
 Jon Nichols – guitar
 Kip Packard – guitar
 David Raven – drums
 Danny Saber – bass, guitar, bass guitar
 Chris Smith – Hammond B3
 Patrick Warren – keyboards

Production

 Eric "ET" Thorngren – audio production, producer, engineer, mastering, mixing
 Danny Saber – programming, mixing, audio production, producer
 Mike Bradford – mixing, audio production, producer
 Bryan Golder – Digital Editing
 David Gamson – programming, mixing
 Oliver Leiber – producer, audio production, engineer
 Patricia Sullivan Fourstar – mastering
 Jeff Chenault – art Direction, design

 John Franck – product manager
 Marc DeSisto – engineer
 Greg Waterman – photography
 Kimberly Goodnight – fashion advisor
 Peggy Seagren – make-up, hair stylist
 Carla Solinger – stylist
 Rob Hill – engineer
 David Wilkes – A&R

Charts

Certifications

References

2003 albums
Beth Hart albums